Mayorga can refer to:

Places
 Mayorga, Spain, a Spanish town
 Mayorga, Leyte, a municipality in the Philippines
 Mayorga de Liberia, a district in Costa Rica
 Puente Mayorga, a village and district of the municipality of San Roque, Province of Cádiz, Andalusia, Spain
 Saelices de Mayorga, a municipality in the province of Valladolid, Castile and León, Spain

People
 Benjamín Mayorga Mora (born 1966), a Costa Rican soccer player
 Dionisio Gutierrez Mayorga (born 1959), a Guatemalan businessman
 Francisco Mayorga (born 1949), a Nicaraguan economist and writer
 Francisco Javier Mayorga Castañeda (born 1951), a Mexican businessman and politician
 Juan Mayorga (born 1965), Spanish dramatist
 Juan José Gutiérrez Mayorga (born 1958), Guatemalan businessman
 Lincoln Mayorga (born 1937), an American pianist, arranger, conductor and composer
 Lupe Mayorga, a Mexican filmmaker
 Martín de Mayorga (1721 – 1783), a Spanish military officer and governor
 Milena Mayorga, Salvadoran politician
 Miriam Mayorga (born 1989), Argentine footballer
 Nuvia Mayorga Delgado, Mexican politician
 Patricia Mayorga, Chilean journalist
 Pedro Mayorga (1921–2014), Argentine equestrian
 Román Mayorga Quirós, Salvadoran politician
 Román Mayorga Rivas (1862–1925), Nicaraguan journalist and poet
 Ricardo Mayorga, Nicaraguan boxer
 Roger Mayorga (born 1946), a retired Nicaraguan footballer
 Ronald Mayorga (born 1984), Colombian journalist
 Roy Mayorga, drummer of American heavy metal band Stone Sour
 Salomón Ibarra Mayorga (1887 – 1985), a Nicaraguan poet and political thinker
 Víctor Mayorga, a Peruvian politician